Tone Merete Sønsterud (born 17 May 1959) is a Norwegian trade union leader and politician who represents the Arbeiderpartiet. She is deputy leader of LO Stat, and the Arbeiderpartiet's fourth candidate from Hedmark at the 2009 Norwegian parliamentary election, and he lives in Kongsvinger. She was deputy representative for the Stortinget 2001-05 and from 2005 to 2009 and has attended for longer.

Sønsterud has a working background in Statistics Norway on Kongsvinger since  1977. She has worked with Norwegian Civil Service Union, and sits on the Norwegian Confederation of Trade Unions representative board. Tone Sønsterud has been a part of the municipal council in Kongsvinger 1984–88, and of Hedmark county council 1988–1991.

References

Members of the Storting
Labour Party (Norway) politicians
Hedmark politicians
Politicians from Kongsvinger
1959 births
Living people
21st-century Norwegian politicians